The 1946 Nobel Prize in Literature was awarded to the German author Hermann Hesse "for his inspired writings which, while growing in boldness and penetration, exemplify the classical humanitarian ideals and high qualities of style".

Laureate

Hermann Hesse was a novelist and a poet whose writings are influenced by the likes of Francis of Assisi, Buddha, Nietzsche and Dostoyevsky. His best known works – Demian (1919), Siddhartha (1922), Der Steppenwolf (1927),  and Das Glasperlenspiel ("The Glass Bead Game", 1943) – deals with the individual's search for self-knowledge and spirituality, often through mysticism.

Deliberations

Nominations
Hermann Hesse was nominated for the prize eight times, first in 1931 by the 1929 Nobel Prize laureate Thomas Mann. In 1946 the Nobel committee received one nomination for Hesse by the Swiss literature professor and author Robert Faesi, and one nomination by Anders Österling of the Swedish Academy.

In total, the Nobel committee received 32 nominations for 22 individuals including Nikolai Berdyaev, T. S. Eliot (awarded in 1948), E. M. Forster, H. G. Wells, Arnulf Øverland, Georges Duhamel,  and Marie Under. Nine of the authors were first-time nominated namely André Gide (awarded in 1947), François Mauriac (awarded in 1952), Winston Churchill (awarded in 1953), Boris Pasternak (awarded in 1958), Sholem Asch, Tarjei Vesaas, Angelos Sikelianos and Ignazio Silone. The Swiss author Charles Ferdinand Ramuz was the most nominated with four nominations. Marie Under and Maria Madalena de Martel Patrício were the only women nominated.

The authors Marion Angus, Octave Aubry, Eduard Bass, John Langalibalele Dube, Ronald Fangen, Constance Garnett, Harley Granville-Barker, Pedro Henríquez Ureña, Violet Jacob, Orrick Glenday Johns, Nikolai Alexandrovich Morozov, Ernest Rhys, Alfred Rosenberg, Damon Runyon, Thomas Scott-Ellis, Edward Sheldon, Mary Amelia St. Clair (known as May Sinclair), Gertrude Stein, Booth Tarkington and Ibn Zaydan died in 1946 without having been nominated for the prize.

References

External links
1946 Award ceremony speech

1946
Hermann Hesse